Dorothy Lee (born Marjorie Elizabeth Millsap, May 23, 1911 – June 24, 1999) was an American actress and comedian during the 1930s. She appeared in 28 films, usually appearing alongside the Wheeler & Woolsey comedy team.

Biography

Born in Los Angeles, Marjorie Elizabeth Millsap was the daughter of Homer and Bess Millsap. Her father was an attorney in Los Angeles. 

She became an actress known as Dorothy Lee. Her first film was Syncopation (1929). 

Lee began her career as a dancer in a stage show, Ideas. When she happened to be watching scenes shot backstage for a film, the director asked her to take a small part in the film because the woman who was supposed to have the part did not show up. She later went to New York for a role in the stage show Hello Yourself. Her work in that production caught the attention of an RKO director, leading to her being in Syncopation, which was being filmed in New York.

At 18, she signed with RKO Radio Pictures and began working with Wheeler & Woolsey; she became so identified with the comedians that she seldom appeared apart from them. Of W & W's 21 feature films, Lee is the leading lady in 14 of them.
She withdrew from the series after producer David O. Selznick tampered with her performance in Girl Crazy; she returned when Selznick's successor Mark Sandrich cast her in two well-received features in 1934. RKO replaced her with Mary Carlisle and then Betty Grable, but she returned in 1935 for two appearances. 

In the early 1940s, after Robert Woolsey had died, Bert Wheeler was struggling to re-establish himself as a solo performer, and asked Dorothy Lee to tour with him in vaudeville. She immediately interrupted her private life to help her friend.

Marriages
 Charles J. Calderini
 F. John Bersbach Jr. (1941 - 1960, divorced)  Lee married Bersbach, a Chicago printing executive, on December 10, 1941, in Winnetka, Illinois.
 A.Gordon Atwater (married in 1936) Lee married Atwater, a business executive, on March 7, 1936, in Crown Point, Indiana.
 Marshall D. Duffield, Sr (September 3, 1933 - November 1935; divorced Lee married former college football star Duffield in Agua Caliente.
 Jimmy Fidler (November 7, 1930; divorced) She married Fidler in San Bernardino, California.
 Robert O. Boothe (November 18, 1927 - 1929; dissolved)

Death
Lee died on June 24, 1999, aged   88, in San Diego, California, from respiratory failure, and is buried in Prospect Hill Cemetery, 
Rice, Jo Daviess County, Illinois.

Partial filmography
Note that a completely different actress named "Dorothy Lee" appeared in several silent film in 1924 and '25, and is sometimes confused with this Dorothy Lee, who made her film debut in 1929.  Films marked † also feature Wheeler & Woolsey; she also made one film (marked ‡) with Wheeler but not Woolsey. 

 Syncopation (1929)
 Rio Rita (1929) †
 The Cuckoos (1930) †
 Dixiana (1930) †
 Half Shot at Sunrise (1930) †
 Hook, Line and Sinker (1930) †
 Cracked Nuts (1931) †
 Local Boy Makes Good (1931)
 Too Many Cooks (1932) ‡ 
 Peach-O-Reno (1931) †
 Caught Plastered (1931) †
 Laugh and Get Rich (1931)
 The Stolen Jools (1931, cameo appearance in short subject) †
 Girl Crazy (1932) †
 Plane Crazy (1933)
 Maizie (1933)
 A Preferred List (1933, lead in short subject)
 Hips, Hips, Hooray! (1934) †
 School for Girls (1934)
 Cockeyed Cavaliers (1934) †
 The Curtain Falls (1934)
 The Rainmakers (1935) †
 Without Children  (1935)
 Silly Billies (1936) †
Too Many Blondes (1941)

References

External links

 
 

American musical theatre actresses
American women comedians
1911 births
1999 deaths
20th-century American actresses
20th-century American singers
20th-century American women singers
20th-century American comedians